Fulvia Mammi (25 May 1927 – 4 June 2006) was an Italian  actress and voice actress.

Life and career 
Born in Rome, Mammi attended the Silvio D'Amico National Academy of Dramatic Art and made her theatrical debut in Peccato che sia una sgualdrina. Mainly active on stage, she worked with Giorgio Strehler, André Barsacq, Giuseppe Patroni Griffi among others. Between late 1940s and early 1960s she was also active in films, usually playing roles of sensible and fragile women.  She was also active as a voice actress and a dubber.  She died on June 4, 2006, at the Retirement Home for Artists in Bologna.

Selected filmography 
 The Flame That Will Not Die (1949)
 The Cadets of Gascony (1950)
 Red Seal (1950)
 Against the Law (1950)
 Toto the Third Man (1951)
 The Queen of Sheba (1952)
 Red and Black (1955)
 Il bell'Antonio (1960)

References

External links 

 

1927 births
2006 deaths
Actresses from Rome
Italian film actresses
Italian television actresses
Italian stage actresses
Italian voice actresses
20th-century Italian actresses
Accademia Nazionale di Arte Drammatica Silvio D'Amico alumni